Khalas is a cultivar of the palm date that is widely grown in eastern Saudi Arabia and the Persian Gulf region. It has brown skin.

See also
List of date cultivars
Zahidi (date)

References

Date cultivars
Agriculture in Saudi Arabia